East Village Historic District may refer to:

in the United States (by state)
 East Village Historic District (Chicago, Illinois), listed on the NRHP in Chicago, Illinois
 East Village Historic District (Amherst, Massachusetts), listed on the NRHP in Massachusetts
 East Village Historic District (Milwaukee, Wisconsin), listed on the NRHP in Wisconsin